José Pedro Costa Amorim Cerqueira (born 8 July 1992) simply known as Zé Pedro, is a Portuguese professional footballer playing for Vilaverdense as a forward.

Club career
On 14 April 2011, he was an unused substitute in Europa League quarter-finals match against Dynamo Kyiv despite still being an academy scholar.

From 2011 to 2015 Zé Pedro played in the third tier of Portuguese football, representing Tourizense and Limianos. On 1 July 2015, Zé Pedro signed his first professional contract with top division club Rio Ave.

References

1992 births
Living people
People from Ponte de Lima
Association football forwards
Portuguese footballers
Primeira Liga players
Liga Portugal 2 players
Segunda Divisão players
G.D. Tourizense players
Rio Ave F.C. players
Académico de Viseu F.C. players
Vilaverdense F.C. players
Merelinense F.C. players
A.R. São Martinho players
Sportspeople from Viana do Castelo District